Kwagga van Niekerk (born 27 May 1999) is an South African-born Scottish rugby union player for Colorno in the italian Top10. Van Niekerk's primary position is lock, flanker or number eight.

Rugby Union career

Professional career

Van Niekerk represented  in the 2018 Rugby Challenge. He moved to Scotland in 2019 to represent Scotland U20, who he qualifies for through his mother. He made his Edinburgh debut on 11 February in the re-arranged Round 8 match of the 2021–22 United Rugby Championship against .

In 2019 he is named in Scotland U20 squad.

External links
itsrugby Profile

References

1999 births
Alumni of Monument High School
Living people
Golden Lions players
Edinburgh Rugby players
Rugby union locks
Rugby union flankers
Rugby union number eights
Scottish rugby union players